Jorge Borges (born 17 April 1952 in São Vicente, Cape Verde) is a Cape Verdean politician. He served as the minister of foreign affairs and communities and minister of defence from 2011 to 2014. He succeeded José Brito and was succeeded by Jorge Tolentino.

See also
Foreign relations of Cape Verde

References

External links
Jorge Borges at the Ministry of Foreign Affairs and Communities website 

Living people
1952 births
Foreign ministers of Cape Verde
People from São Vicente, Cape Verde